The 1906 Copa de Honor Cousenier was the final match to decide the winner of the Copa de Honor Cousenier, the 2nd. edition of the international competition organised by the Argentine and Uruguayan Associations together. The final was contested by Uruguayan side Club Nacional de Football and Argentine team Alumni. 

The match was held in the Estadio Gran Parque Central in Montevideo, on September 16, 1906. It ended tied (11) so a playoff was scheduled for October 14 in the same venue. Alumni won the re-match 3–1, taking revenge from the previous edition and winning its first Copa Cousenier trophy.

Qualified teams 

Note

Match details

Final

Playoff 

|

References

C
C
1906 in Argentine football
1906 in Uruguayan football